The Middle East Film and Comic Con (commonly referred to as MEFCC) is a speculative fiction convention held annually in Dubai, United Arab Emirates in the month of April. 

The MEFCC showcases comic books and film/television, and other pop culture elements, such as horror/science fiction/fantasy novels, artwork, animation, anime, manga, toys, collectible card games and other tabletop games, video games, and webcomics. It also focuses on regionally created content such as Xero Error, Freej, FOBcity, Gold Ring, The Sons of Two Suns , etc. The convention is the first and largest of its kind in the Middle East region.
Along with panels, seminars, and workshops with comic book professionals, there are previews of upcoming  films, portfolio review sessions with comic book companies and a cosplay contest.

Over its history, MEFCC has hosted many celebrities in the world of pop-culture, including Jason Momoa, John Rhys-Davies, Gillian Anderson, William Shatner, Nikolaj Coster-Waldau, Anthony Mackie, and Liam Cunningham.

History
The convention was founded in April 2012 by a Dubai-based events management and communications agency ExtraCake PRA and The Alliance. In 2018 Informa Canada Inc. took over operation of the event.

Event history

References

External links

 
 YouTube channel

Annual events in the United Arab Emirates
Comics conventions
Events in Dubai
Festivals in the United Arab Emirates
Multigenre conventions
Recurring events established in 2012
Spring (season) events in the United Arab Emirates